Lactuca saligna is a species of wild lettuce known by the common name willowleaf lettuce, and least lettuce. It is native to Eurasia but it grows in many other places as an introduced species, including much of North America.

It can be found rarely in south-east England on dry banks near the sea and estuaries.

Description
It is much slenderer than great lettuce Lactuca virosa and prickly lettuce Lactuca serriola. The spindly, mainly erect stem has bristles on its lower portion. The top part of the stem is occupied by a narrow inflorescence. The branches may be pressed against the main stem, or they may branch outward. There are no disc florets.

Lactuca saligna flowers from July to August in Britain.

References

External links

Jepson Manual Treatment, University of California
Calphotos Photo gallery, University of California
Photo of herbarium specimen at Missouri Botanical Garden, collected in Oklahoma in 1989

saligna
Plants described in 1753
Taxa named by Carl Linnaeus
Flora of Europe